João Soares de Almeida Neto (born 30 January 1980), known as Joãozinho Neto, is a Brazilian footballer, currently playing for Camaçari Futebol Clube.

Career
Joãozinho started his career at Cruzeiro, one of the biggest club of Minas Gerais.  He left Brazil for Spanish side Recreativo de Huelva on 29 January 2003.

He left Brazil again for Litex Lovech on 20 July 2004. He moved back to Brazil for Brasiliense on 15 August 2005, signing a contract until the end of the 2006 season. he played for the club at 2006 Copa do Brasil before left for Portuguesa and Ipatinga.

In January 2007, he signed a one-year contract with Esporte Clube Vitória. He extended his contract for an additional year in September 2007, and he also played for the club at Copa do Brasil 2007. Joãozinho would lead Vitória to the Campeonato Brasileiro Série B title, scoring 19 goals during the season. In January 2008, he went on loan to Mexican Primera División side Monarcas Morelia.

In June 2008, he signed a 2-year contract with Atlético Paranaense. In January 2009, he left for Ipatinga.

In April 2009, he was signed by Bahia at Campeonato Brasileiro Série B.

Personal life
He also known as Joãozinho Neto to avoid confusion with other his former teammate at Portuguesa, Joãozinho.

References

External links
https://web.archive.org/web/20090626083151/http://futpedia.globo.com/jogadores/joaozinho5

Brazilian footballers
Brazilian expatriate footballers
Cruzeiro Esporte Clube players
Guarani FC players
Ipatinga Futebol Clube players
Santa Cruz Futebol Clube players
Recreativo de Huelva players
Fluminense FC players
Esporte Clube Juventude players
Paysandu Sport Club players
PFC Litex Lovech players
Brasiliense Futebol Clube players
Associação Portuguesa de Desportos players
Esporte Clube Vitória players
Atlético Morelia players
Club Athletico Paranaense players
Esporte Clube Bahia players
La Liga players
First Professional Football League (Bulgaria) players
Liga MX players
Expatriate footballers in Spain
Expatriate footballers in Bulgaria
Expatriate footballers in Mexico
Brazilian expatriate sportspeople in Spain
Brazilian expatriate sportspeople in Bulgaria
Brazilian expatriate sportspeople in Mexico
Association football forwards
Footballers from Belo Horizonte
1980 births
Living people